Obdulio Jacinto Muiños Varela (September 20, 1917 — August 2, 1996) was a Uruguayan football player. He was the captain of the Uruguay national team that won the 1950 World Cup after beating Brazil in the decisive final round match popularly known as the Maracanazo. He was nicknamed "El Negro Jefe" (The Black Chief) because of his dark skin and the influence he had on the pitch, especially during the unlikely victory over Brazil. He was of African, Spanish and Greek ancestry. Commonly regarded as one of the greatest classic holding midfielders, Varela was adept in defence and was renowned for his tenacity and leadership. He is regarded as one of the greatest captains in football history, and "he remains one of the biggest sporting heroes in Uruguay".

Club career
Varela, born in Montevideo, emerged as a centre half and senior player at Deportivo Juventud, club which he joined in 1936. He debuted in first division with Montevideo Wanderers in 1938.

In 1943, he joined C.A. Peñarol, club for which he would play until his professional retirement in 1955.

International career
Varela's international debut came in a 3–2 win against Chile in the 1939 Copa América in Lima, Peru. Varela entered the match as a substitute.

He played 45 international matches for Uruguay from 1939 to 1954, in which he scored nine goals.

He's most remembered as the captain of the Uruguay team that won 1950 FIFA World Cup, in which he "was the architect of" Brazil's downfall. The decisive match was against the hosts Brazil. Uruguay needed to win, but Brazil could win the Cup with a draw. Then when the team were on the dressing room, Juan López, the coach of the Uruguayan team told his players that the best way they could get a chance against Brazil was if they adopted a defensive style, then he left the room and Varela told his teammates “Juan is a good man, but if we do defend ourselves then we will suffer the same fate of Sweden and Spain” (Brazil had beaten Sweden 7-1 and Spain 6-1), and then said “the game is played on the pitch, when you come out to the pitch, don't look to the crowd, those on the outside are made of wood”. 
The speech played a vital role on his teammates, who played without fear getting a 0–0 draw on the halftime. Five minutes in the second half, Brazil scored, and Varela took scene, when he intentionally walked slowly to his goal, picked up the ball and then argued with the English referee George Reader about a nonexistent offside, with the intention of delaying the restart of the game so the crowd cooled off. After that he said to his teammates 'Now it's time to win the game' and the Brazilians in the crowd were in a silent mood. Uruguay scored through Schiaffino and then, 9 minutes before the finish, with a very nervous Brazil team, Alcides Ghiggia scored the 2–1 for Uruguay, winning the World Cup. 
Following the win "Varela spent that evening drinking with shellshocked Brazilians in a Rio bar" ignoring the warnings of Uruguayan officials.

He also played on the 1954 FIFA World Cup with Uruguay defending his 1950 title, but this time, Varela got injured celebrating a goal in the quarter final vs. England, which Uruguay won 4–2, causing him to miss the semi final. Uruguay had never lost a World Cup match when Varela was present.

Post-playing career

His last match was on June 19, 1955 with Peñarol against América. Varela, one of the team's coaches along with Roque Maspoli, came off the bench for the second half but when he realized he couldn't continue, he decided to end his career.

Varela died on August 2, 1996. His remains are buried at Cementerio del Cerro, Montevideo.

Honours
With Uruguay:
FIFA World Cup winner in 1950
Copa América winner in 1942
Copa Baron de Rio Branco winner against Brasil in 1940, 1946, 1948
Copa Escobar Gerona winner in 1943

With Peñarol:
Uruguayan first division league champion in 1944, 1945, 1949, 1951, 1953 and 1954
Torneo de Honor winner in 1944, 1945, 1947, 1949, 1950, 1951, 1952 and 1953
Competencia tourney winner in 1943, 1946, 1947, 1949, 1951 1953

Varela was among the 13 best South American players of the 20th century according to the IFFHS' Century Elections.

References and notes

External links

 Obdulio Jacinto Varela 1917-1996 – career information and an interview with Varela
 Varela at the Brazilian Museo dos Esportes (Museum of Sports)

1917 births
1996 deaths
Uruguayan people of Spanish descent
Uruguayan people of Greek descent
Uruguayan people of African descent
Uruguayan footballers
Uruguayan Primera División players
Montevideo Wanderers F.C. players
Peñarol players
Uruguay international footballers
FIFA World Cup-winning captains
FIFA World Cup-winning players
1950 FIFA World Cup players
1954 FIFA World Cup players
Uruguayan football managers
Peñarol managers
Burials at Cementerio del Cerro, Montevideo
Copa América-winning players
Association football midfielders
Association football defenders